The canton of Nangis is a French administrative division, located in the Seine-et-Marne département (Île-de-France région).

Demographics

Composition 
At the French canton reorganisation which came into effect in March 2015, the canton was expanded from 17 to 46 communes:

Andrezel
Argentières
Aubepierre-Ozouer-le-Repos
Beauvoir
Blandy
Bois-le-Roi
Bombon
Bréau
Champdeuil
Champeaux
La Chapelle-Gauthier
La Chapelle-Rablais
Chartrettes
Châteaubleau
Le Châtelet-en-Brie
Châtillon-la-Borde
Clos-Fontaine
Courtomer
Crisenoy
La Croix-en-Brie
Échouboulains
Les Écrennes
Féricy
Fontaine-le-Port
Fontains
Fontenailles
Fouju
Gastins
Grandpuits-Bailly-Carrois
Guignes
Machault
Moisenay
Mormant
Nangis
Pamfou
Quiers
Rampillon
Saint-Just-en-Brie
Saint-Méry
Saint-Ouen-en-Brie
Sivry-Courtry
Valence-en-Brie
Vanvillé
Verneuil-l'Étang
Vieux-Champagne 
Yèbles

See also
Cantons of the Seine-et-Marne department
Communes of the Seine-et-Marne department

References

Nangis